Gómez Farías is one of the 67 municipalities of Chihuahua, in northern Mexico. The municipal seat lies at Valentín Gómez Farías, Chihuahua. The municipality covers an area of 986.6 km².

It was named for Valentín Gómez Farías, a 19th-century President of the Republic.

As of 2010, the municipality had a total population of 8,624, up from 7,583 as of 2005. 

The municipality had 42 localities, the largest of which (with 2010 populations in parentheses) were: Valentín Gómez Farías (5,330), classified as urban, and Peña Blanca (1,092), classified as rural.

References

Municipalities of Chihuahua (state)